María León Barrios (Andalusian ; born 30 July 1984) is a Spanish actress from Seville, Andalusia. She is best known for her performances as Leti in SMS and Carmen in Allí abajo.

Career 
León became best known for her role in the 2011 film The Sleeping Voice, for which she won a Goya for Best New Actress. She has played the main role of Carmen in Allí abajo since 2015, which includes appearances from her mother, Carmina Barrios. She has also acted alongside her brother, Paco León, in his show Aída and on The House of Flowers (playing siblings in the latter), and performed as a character based on herself in the Carmina films Paco directed, which star their mother.

León expanded her work in 2019, starring in the final season of Allí abajo, as well as The House of Flowers and the films Escapada and Los Japón. She also filmed La lista, a dramatic comedy about breast cancer, with Victoria Abril, and performed in a version of Lorca's Yerma in the theatre in Granada, Valencia, and Seville.

Selected filmography

Accolades

References

External links
 

1984 births
Living people
Spanish film actresses
People from Seville
21st-century Spanish actresses
Actresses from Andalusia
Spanish television actresses